Vladimir Vasilyevich Granat (born 22 May 1987) is a Russian professional footballer who plays as a centre-back.

Career

Club
On 11 May 2014, during the Russian Premier League match against Zenit St. Petersburg, Granat was attacked by a Zenit fan who had invaded the pitch, resulting in Granat being hospitalized with concussion and a broken jaw.

In March 2015, Granat agreed to move from FC Dynamo Moscow to rivals FC Spartak Moscow during the 2015 Summer transfer window.

On 10 June 2017, after one season with FC Rostov, he moved to FC Rubin Kazan.

Two years after last appearing on the field, on 18 February 2021 he joined third-tier PFL club Olimp-Dolgoprudny. He left the club at the end of the 2020–21 season and then returned to it in February 2022.

International
On 11 May 2012, Granat was named in the Russia's provisional squad for the UEFA Euro 2012. It was the first time Granat had been called up to the national team.  On 25 May 2012 Granat was confirmed as in the final squad for UEFA Euro 2012.
Granat  made his debut for the national team in the 2014 FIFA World Cup qualifying game against Luxembourg on 6 September 2013.
On 2 June 2014, Granat was included in the Russia's 2014 FIFA World Cup squad. He remained on the bench in all three games Russia played at the tournament.

On 11 May 2018, he was included in Russia's extended 2018 FIFA World Cup squad. On 3 June 2018, he was included in the finalized World Cup squad. He made one appearance at the tournament as a half-time substitute in the Round of 16 defeat of Spain for injured Yuri Zhirkov.

Personal life
His grandparents from father line came from Ukraine; the family name Granat is also of Eastern European Jewish origin. Vladimir Granat was raised in a big family. He is married with two children.

Career statistics

Club

International

International goals

References

1987 births
Living people
People from Ulan-Ude
Russian footballers
Russia under-21 international footballers
Russia national football B team footballers
Russia international footballers
Association football defenders
FC Dynamo Moscow players
FC Sibir Novosibirsk players
UEFA Euro 2012 players
2014 FIFA World Cup players
FC Zvezda Irkutsk players
FC Spartak Moscow players
FC Spartak-2 Moscow players
FC Rostov players
FC Rubin Kazan players
FC Olimp-Dolgoprudny players
Russian people of Ukrainian descent
Russian Premier League players
Russian First League players
Russian Second League players
2018 FIFA World Cup players
Russian Jews
Sportspeople from Buryatia